The Astra was made by Automobiles Astra, Liège, Belgium in 1930. It is considered a textbook example of car design piracy, as the 1,100cc S.C.A.P.-engined car that made its debut at the 1930 Brussels Motor Show was an almost exact copy of the Tracta. It never went into production, and the projected 6- and 8- cylinder versions were, most likely, never built.

Defunct motor vehicle manufacturers of Belgium